Kisyeri Werema Chambiri (born 1 January 1954) is a Tanzanian CCM politician and Member of Parliament for Babati Town constituency since 2010.

References

1954 births
Living people
Chama Cha Mapinduzi MPs
Tanzanian MPs 2010–2015
Ifunda Technical Secondary School alumni
Kibaha Secondary School alumni
University of Lagos alumni